Hedley Clarence Taylor (September 20, 1864 – February 23, 1931) was a Canadian politician and judge. Taylor was born in Sheffield, New Brunswick in 1864. He studied law at Mt. Alison University and the University of Michigan, in 1891. He partnered with John R. Boyle to form the firm of Taylor & Boyle, which later became Boyle, Parlee, Freeman, Abbott & Mustard. He served as a district judge for the city of Edmonton, ran unsuccessfully for alderman and mayor in several Edmonton municipal elections, and served multiple terms on the Edmonton Public School Board. He died in Victoria, British Columbia in 1931 of pneumonia.

References

1864 births
1931 deaths
Judges in Alberta
Alberta school board trustees
People from Sunbury County, New Brunswick
University of Michigan Law School alumni
Deaths from pneumonia in British Columbia